Laura Neiva (born September 21, 1993) is a Brazilian actress and model. She appeared in the film Adrift, which competed in the 2009 Cannes Film Festival.

Career
Born in São Paulo, the actress was discovered in Orkut in 2007 by the Adrift's film crew who was looking for a protagonist. The film was directed by Heitor Dhalia and the French actor Vincent Cassel; the Brazilian American actress Camilla Belle and the Brazilian actress Débora Bloch were also part of the cast. Her second film was the blockbuster E Aí... Comeu?, in which she worked with Bruno Mazzeo. She was part of the cast of the short film DES. together with the stylist Alexandre Herchcovitch, who was responsible for Adrift's wardrobe.

Her success attracted the attention of the fashion industry, and she was hired as the spokesperson of the brands Corello and Fillity. In 2012 she was hired by the stylist Karl Lagerfeld to work as Chanel's Brazilian ambassador.

The actress starred in the 2013 remake of Rede Globo's telenovela Saramandaia as Stela Rosado. Laura Neiva played Betina, who is a character who has a romantic relationship with Mariana Lima's character Roberta Camargo, in the 2014 remake of the 1974 telenovela O Rebu.

Filmography

Cinema

Television

Theater

References

External links

 
 

1993 births
Living people
Actresses from São Paulo
21st-century Brazilian actresses
Brazilian film actresses
Brazilian female models
Brazilian stage actresses
Brazilian television actresses